Monte Café (Portuguese for "coffee mountain") is a village on São Tomé Island in the nation of São Tomé and Príncipe. Its population is 684 (2012 census). It lies 4.5 km west of Trindade. Situated in a mountainous terrain at 670 m elevation, very suitable for the cultivation of coffee, it is the site of one of the oldest plantations of São Tomé, established in 1858.

Population history

Sporting club
Agrosport, currently plays in the second regional division

References

Populated places in Mé-Zóchi District